The 2002 Asian Junior Athletics Championships was the tenth edition of the international athletics competition for Asian under-20 athletes, organised by the Asian Athletics Association. It took place from 28–31 October in Bangkok, Thailand. A total of 43 events were contested, which were divided equally between male and female athletes aside from the men's 3000 metres steeplechase.

Medal summary

Men

Women

2002 Medal Table

References

Results
Asian Junior Championships 2002. World Junior Athletics History. Retrieved on 2013-10-17.

External links
Asian Athletics official website

Asian Junior Championships
Asian Junior Athletics Championships
International athletics competitions hosted by Thailand
Sport in Bangkok
Asian Junior Athletics Championships
2002 in Asian sport
2002 in youth sport